Destination Fear was a Canadian paranormal television series that premiered on May 5, 2012 in Canada and September 3, 2012 in the United States. The program features ghost hunters and practical jokers who visit paranormal hotspots reported to be haunted. Guests are unaware they were set up by friends or loved ones to experience staged, frightening encounters. The show was cancelled in July 2012.

Summary
Each episode features two unsuspecting ghost-hunting enthusiasts given the chance by a close friend or relative to investigate or tour a haunted location in Canada or America. Under the impression their ventures are real encounters, guests are actually set up to experience paranormal activity, scaring them to the bone. At the end of the episode, the host replays the encounters, lets them in on the joke and exposes the real perpetrators, their friends or family.

Opening introduction:

Cast and crew
Killian Gray (host)
Lindsay Lyon
Andy King
Ayumi Iizuka
Colin Munch

Series overview

Episodes

Season 1 (2012)

See also
Apparitional experience
Parapsychology
Ghost hunting
Paranormal television
Haunted locations in the United States

References

External links
 
 
 

2010s American reality television series
2012 American television series debuts
Paranormal reality television series
Travel Channel original programming